Cheung Kong Tsuen is a village in Pat Heung, Yuen Long District, Hong Kong.

Administration
Cheung Kong Tsuen is a recognized village under the New Territories Small House Policy.

References

External links
 Delineation of area of existing village Cheung Kong Tsuen (Pat Heung) for election of resident representative (2019 to 2022)

Pat Heung

Villages in Yuen Long District, Hong Kong